"Te Busqué" is a song by Canadian singer-songwriter Nelly Furtado from her third studio album, Loose (2006), featuring Juanes. The song was written by Furtado, Juanes, and Lester Mendez, who also produced the song. The song was released in June 2007 as the album's sixth single.

Background
Furtado originally wrote the song in mid-2005 to a beat that Lester Mendez had created, with the verses in English and the choruses in Spanish. Furtado disliked the chorus and discussed it with Juanes, who had collaborated with Furtado on his single "Fotografía" (2003) and who had played at the Universal Amphitheatre in Los Angeles, where Furtado and Mendez were working.> Juanes agreed to co-write a duet with Furtado for the album, and he flew from Mexico to Toronto, Ontario, where they wrote the song in two days. Juanes played electric and acoustic guitar on the track. The song was released on July 8, 2006 to the iTunes Store in Spain, where it was released as the first single from the album. The main reason for the single's release in Spain was the limited success that hip-hop/R&B-influenced songs in the style of "Promiscuous" and "Maneater", the album's lead singles in North America and the rest of Europe, respectively, achieved in the country. A music video was scheduled to be shot in December 2006, but the video shoot was cancelled due to scheduling conflicts. The song was not officially released in the United States as a single, but it was given airplay on Latin music radio stations and reached number 24 on Billboards Latin Pop Airplay chart.

Track listing

CD single (2 track)
"Te Busque" (English Version) – 3:39
"Te Busque" (Spanish Version) – 3:38

CD single / digital download (4 track)
"Te Busque" (English Version) – 3:39
"Te Busque" (Spanish Version) – 3:38
"Runaway" – 4:19
"Say It Right" (Reggae Main Mix) featuring Courtney John – 3:59

Digital download (5 track)
"Te Busque" – 3:38
"Te Busque" (Full Spanish Version) – 3:38
"Lo Bueno Siempre Tiene un Final" – 4:24
"En Las Manos de Dios" – 4:29
"Dar" – 4:40

Credits and Personnel
Nelly Furtado - songwriting, vocals 
Juanes - writing, vocals
Lester Mendez - writing, producer

Charts

Weekly charts

Year-end charts

Release history

References

2006 songs
2006 singles
Juanes songs
Nelly Furtado songs
Number-one singles in Spain
Spanish-language songs
Songs written by Lester Mendez
Songs written by Juanes
Songs written by Nelly Furtado
Song recordings produced by Lester Mendez
Geffen Records singles
Mosley Music Group singles